Keystone is an unincorporated community in Tuolumne County, California, United States.

References

Unincorporated communities in Tuolumne County, California
Unincorporated communities in California